Regional parks in Western Australia are conservation areas with the purpose of serving as urban havens to preserve and restore cultural heritage and valuable ecosystems as well as to encourage sustainable nature-based recreation activities.
 
As of 2021, there are eleven regional parks in the Perth region of Western Australia, as well as regional parks outside the metropolitan area.

Apart from the already existing regional parks, future proposals exist, like the recently approved Kalgulup Regional Park, located within the City of Bunbury, Shire of Capel, Shire of Dardanup and Shire of Harvey, which encompass the former Preston River to Ocean Regional Park proposal, proposed for almost 40 years, and the Leschenault Regional Park along the Collie and Brunswick Rivers.

Another one, the Darling Range Regional Park in the Darling Scarp, was proposed as the largest regional park in Australia, with 11,703 hectares, but never fully realised and eventually replaced by a number of smaller national and regional parks.

History
The concept of regional spaces in Western Australia open to the public was first proposed in 1955, when the Stephenson-Hepburn Report recommended preserving private land for future public use in what would become the Perth Metropolitan Region in 1963. The Environmental Protection Authority (EPA) identified areas of significant conservation, landscape and recreation value in a report in 1983. In 1989, the state Government allocated the responsibility of managing regional parks to the Department of Conservation and Land Management.

A Regional Parks Taskforce was established in 1990 but the EPA reported in 1993 that the establishment of these parks encountered difficulties but, from the mid-1990s, a number of regional parks were established in Western Australia.

List of Western Australian regional parks
The list of regional parks in Western Australia:

See also
 List of protected areas of Western Australia

References

External links
 Parks and Wildlife Service